Kraljević and Kraljevič (sometimes written Kraljevic or Kraljevich) is a surname of Croatian and Serbian origin. Notable people with the surname include:

 Blaž Kraljević (1947–1992), Bosnian Croat paramilitary leader
 Davor Kraljević (born 1978), Croatian footballer
 Hrvoje Kraljević (born 1944), Croatian mathematician and a former politician
 Joviša Kraljevič (born 1976), Slovenian footballer
 Marko Kraljević (footballer), Croatian footballer
 Miroslav Kraljević (1885–1913), Croatian painter

As a title, it has been used to refer to:
Prince Marko (c. 1335 – 1395), also known as Marko Kraljević, de jure the Serbian king from 1371 to 1395

Croatian surnames
Serbian surnames